The Grange consists of three attached, grade II listed buildings in Monmouth, Monmouthshire, Wales. It is in the historic St James Street neighbourhood, within the medieval town walls. The Grange was originally built by Captain Charles Philipps at the site of a former farm house. It was the residence of the Kane family and, later, the Windsor family. The buildings also served as a preparatory school, one of the schools of the Haberdashers' Company, until 2009. In 2011, the buildings were converted into a boarding house for students of Monmouth School, another Haberdashers' Company school.

History and design

During the eighteenth century, much of the north side of St James Street in Monmouth was devoted to a farm house, barn, stable, buildings for oxen, and an enclosure for sheep or cattle. The Grange is located at the site of the former farm house, and was constructed by Captain Charles Philipps. After having lived at Monnow Street in the mid nineteenth century, the Kane family lived at The Grange on St James Street for at least fifty years. At the time of the 1861 and 1871 census enumerations, John Joseph Kane, Esquire, a native of Lincoln, Lincolnshire, England, resided at The Grange with his wife Sarah Ann, adult children, and servants. Kane continued to live there in 1875, and died the following year on 1 October 1876. In 1881, his widow Sarah Ann, a native of Monmouth, lived there with her two spinster daughters. Sisters Sarah Ann and Ellen Kane, both born in Monmouth, resided there in 1891, 1901, and 1911. At the time of those census enumerations, the address of The Grange was recorded as 14 St James Street, and in 1911 the main house had sixteen rooms. In 1923 and 1934, Frederick Reuben Windsor, an electrical engineer, resided at The Grange. A native of Bushey, Hertfordshire, England, Windsor lived there until his death on 25 February 1955.

The Grange at 12–16 St James Street now consists of three connected buildings on the northwest side of the street, as well as an extension at the back of the property. Located within the medieval town walls built around 1300, all three houses are Grade II listed. The three-storey, five-bay main house is currently recorded at 12 St James Street and has railings in front of the street elevation. The listed building has a slate roof and an eighteenth or early nineteenth-century facade with band courses and quoins. The entrance features a pedimented porch with Doric columns and a transom (fanlight). The entablature of the pedimented porch has a frieze with a metope in the style of the Brothers Adam. The pediment has a firemark, a plaque noting that the building owner had given financially to the town fire department. The red brick building next to The Grange at 10 St James Street was once its stable.

The Grange preparatory school

The Grange, the buildings on St James Street, should be distinguished from The Grange, the preparatory school of the Haberdashers' Company, also known as the Worshipful Company of Haberdashers. While the buildings on St James Street housed the prep school for boys ages seven to eleven for decades, in February 2009 the school moved across the River Wye into new quarters on Hadnock Road, east of the town centre. The site chosen for the new preparatory school is in close proximity to Monmouth School's Sports Complex. The new building was designed by the architectural team of Buttress Fuller Alsop Williams. In addition to classroom space, the new Grange includes a garden, kitchen, ICT suite, science laboratory, and art and music facilities. Pupils at The Grange use the Monmouth School's chapel and sports facilities. While students and staff had already started using the new school building on Hadnock Road in February 2009, it wasn't officially dedicated until 23 September 2009. On that day, the new building was formally opened as The Grange, Monmouth Preparatory School, retaining the name of the school's former quarters. HRH Prince Edward, Earl of Wessex, officiated at the September opening ceremonies. After arriving by helicopter, Prince Edward was greeted by the heads of Monmouth School and The Grange, and introduced to town officials. The ceremony included comments from the prince and Elaine Thomas, Head of The Grange. Prince Edward unveiled the commemorative plaque for the new Grange. His visit that day was his third to the Haberdashers' Monmouth Schools since having become a Haberdasher himself. Before the recent move to Hadnock Road, children from the St James Street school distinguished themselves in chess, winning Britain's 2003 national title as under-11 chess champions.

The Grange boarding house

On 19 August 2010, the Monmouthshire County Council released details of an application to redevelop the former prep school at St James Street as a sixth form boarding facility for older students at Monmouth School. Housing for staff members was planned as well. The application indicated that there were three Grade II listed, connected buildings, as well as an extension that had been added at a later date. The plan was to include a new addition that would be attached to the extant extension at the back of the property. On 13 and 14 December 2010, it was announced that permission for the conversion of The Grange from a prep school to a boarding house had been granted. The alteration of The Grange is a component of the first phase of The Heart Project, a substantial renovation of Monmouth School which has recently been undertaken. The new boarding house opened in September 2011 for students in their last year, with Kingsley Jones as housemaster of the new boarding accommodation.

See also

 St James Street, Monmouth
 Monmouth School

References

External links 
 The Grange - Hadnock Road
 Monmouthshire County Council
 Monmouth School - The Heart Project

Houses in Monmouth, Wales
Cadw
Grade II listed buildings in Monmouthshire
Haberdashers' Schools